The acronym GFFA can refer to:
the Star Wars galaxy, also called the "Galaxy Far, Far Away"
the Galactic Federation of Free Alliances, a government in the Star Wars expanded universe